Glendon is an unincorporated community in Braxton County, West Virginia, United States. Glendon had a post office, which opened on July 31, 1889, and closed on November 5, 1994.

References

Unincorporated communities in Braxton County, West Virginia
Unincorporated communities in West Virginia